Muğanlı (also, Mughanly and Mughanlo) is a village and municipality in the Zagatala District of Azerbaijan. It has a population of 2,466.

References 

Populated places in Zaqatala District